Joliet Township is located in Will County, Illinois. As of the 2010 census, its population was 87,398 and it contained 32,617 housing units.

Geography

The segment containing Chicagoland Speedway was ceded to Jackson Township at an unknown date after 1999 for unknown reasons.

Cities, Towns, Villages
 Crest Hill (small portion)
 Elwood (small portion)
 Joliet (mostly)
 New Lenox (small portion)
 Rockdale

Other Communities
 Ingalls Park
 Preston Heights
 Ridgewood

Demographics

References

External links
City-data.com
Will County Official Site
Illinois State Archives

Townships in Will County, Illinois
Townships in Illinois
1849 establishments in Illinois